Sol Sánchez Maroto is a Spanish politician. She was a member of the Cortes Generales twice, representing the Madrid constituency for the United Left Party and Unidas Podemos in 2016 and 2019.

Life and career
Sánchez was born on April 1, 1970. She holds degrees in political science, sociology, and anthropology. She was worked as a banking and financial consultant. She was elected a federal member of parliament for the Constituency of Madrid in 2016, on the list of the Popular Unity party. In 2017 she was selected as the co-spokesperson of United Left–Madrid. Sánchez was placed ninth on the party list in the general elections of 2016 and was not re-elected since the party only won eight seats, but she was elected once again to the Spanish parliament in 2019.

References

Living people
1970 births
Members of the 11th Congress of Deputies (Spain)
Members of the 12th Congress of Deputies (Spain)
21st-century Spanish women politicians